Ángel Gómez Gómez (born 13 May 1981 in Ucieda, Cantabria) is a Spanish professional road bicycle racer.  He has yet to record any professional victories.

Major results

 Vuelta a Valladolid - 1 stage & Overall (2003)
 Circuito Montañés - 1 stage (2003)

External links

Living people
1981 births
Spanish male cyclists
Cyclists from Cantabria
People from the Saja and Nansa Valleys